Lee Hill (1895 – death unknown) was an American Negro league infielder between 1915 and 1920. 

A native of Virginia, Hill made his Negro leagues debut in 1915 with the West Baden Sprudels. He went on to play for the Dayton Marcos and St. Louis Giants.

References

External links
 and Seamheads

1895 births
Date of birth missing
Year of death missing
Place of birth missing
Place of death missing
Dayton Marcos players
St. Louis Giants players
West Baden Sprudels players
Baseball infielders